Alexei Vyacheslavovich Emelin (Russian: Алексей Вячеславович Емелин; born 25 April 1986) is a Russian professional ice hockey defenceman who is currently playing for HC Spartak Moscow of the Kontinental Hockey League (KHL). Emelin was drafted by the Montreal Canadiens in the third round, 84th overall, of the 2004 NHL Entry Draft.

Playing career

Early career
Emelin spent a large portion of his career with Lada Togliatti in the Russian Superleague (RSL) before signing with Ak Bars Kazan. He was also a member of Russia's under-18 and under-20 national squads, and has also become a regular member of the senior national team, skating for both in EuroTour and the World Championships.

In a Kontinental Hockey League (KHL) game in 2009, Emelin sustained a face injury during a fight with Alexander Svitov; an orbital bone shattered and had to be rebuilt with metal plate. He has tried to avoid getting into fights ever since the incident.

Montreal Canadiens
On 17 May 2011, Emelin signed a one-year, two-way contract with the Montreal Canadiens for the 2011–12 season. He played his first regular season NHL game on 9 October, in a 5–1 victory against the Winnipeg Jets. In addition, he scored his first regular season NHL point, an assist, on 6 December, in a game against the Columbus Blue Jackets. On 25 January 2012, he scored his first NHL goal against the Detroit Red Wings.

On 30 June 2012, Emelin signed a two-year extension up until the end of the 2013–14 season.

During the lockout shortened 2012–13 season, Emelin established himself as a key member of the Canadiens' defensive core, often playing with fellow countryman Andrei Markov. He scored three goals and 12 points in 38 games for the Canadiens and finished with a plus-minus rating of +2. His season, however, was derailed by an injury during a game against the Boston Bruins on 6 April 2013, when Emelin collided with Bruins forward Milan Lucic, falling awkwardly and tearing a ligament in his left knee. As a result, Emelin missed the remainder of the regular season and the playoffs. On 31 October 2013, he signed a four-year contract extension with Montreal, lasting through the 2017–18 season.

Nashville Predators
After his sixth season with the Canadiens, Emelin was left exposed at the 2017 NHL Expansion Draft. He was selected by the Vegas Golden Knights on 21 June 2017. On 1 July 2017, the Golden Knights traded Emelin to the Nashville Predators in exchange for a third-round pick in the 2019 NHL Entry Draft. Vegas retained approximately $1.2 million USD of Emelin's salary in the trade. Emelin skated in 76 games with the Predators in his lone season with the club, as well as 10 postseason games.

Avangard Omsk
On 2 September 2018, Emelin returned as a free agent to the KHL, signing a three-year contract with Avangard Omsk.

Dinamo Minsk and Spartak Moscow
After four seasons with Avangard Omsk, Emelin left as a free agent and extended his career in the KHL after signing a one-year contract with Belarusian club, HC Dinamo Minsk, on 26 July 2022. Selected as team captain for Dinamo Minsk in the lead up to the 2022–23 season, Emelin as a regular on the blueline made 38 appearances and registered 9 assists. 

On 19 December 2022, Emelin left Dinamo and transferred to HC Spartak Moscow for the remainder of the season.

Career statistics

Regular season and playoffs

International

Awards and honors

References

External links
 

1986 births
Living people
Ak Bars Kazan players
Avangard Omsk players
HC CSK VVS Samara players
HC Dinamo Minsk players
Ice hockey players at the 2014 Winter Olympics
HC Lada Togliatti players
Montreal Canadiens draft picks
Montreal Canadiens players
Nashville Predators players
Olympic ice hockey players of Russia
HC Spartak Moscow players
Sportspeople from Tolyatti
Russian expatriate sportspeople in the United States
Russian ice hockey defencemen
Russian expatriate sportspeople in Canada
Russian expatriate ice hockey people
Expatriate ice hockey players in the United States
Expatriate ice hockey players in Belarus
Russian expatriate sportspeople in Belarus
Expatriate ice hockey players in Canada